The Hungary national rugby sevens team competes in the FIRA European Sevens circuit.
They first took part in a qualifying tournament for the 1997 Rugby World Cup Sevens in Lisbon in 1996. Playing four matches, they lost all four, including 0-89 and 0-80 scores against New Zealand and Ireland respectively.

Results

2008

2009

 Hungarian wins in bold.

References

Rugby union in Hungary
Hungarian rugby union teams
National rugby sevens teams
Rugby